The Sindika Dokolo Foundation is a cultural foundation headquartered in Luanda, Angola. It is supported by businessman Sindika Dokolo, the organization's president, and managed by its vice president, Fernando Alvim. Simon Njami the organization's consultant.

The foundation is engaged in the preservation, promotion and development of Sindika Dokolo's art collection and the Triennial of Luanda. It was the sponsor of the exhibition Check List Luanda Pop, a side project of Venice Biennale in 2007.

Collection 
The collection stems from the purchase of the Hans Bogatzke's collection. Fernando Alvim is responsible for the collection and the purchase of new art works, mainly those of young artists, and videos and installations.

The art collection is made of art works with a special focus on African artists and the African diaspora, one of the few art collections based in Africa. It is defined as a contemporary African art collection by its curator, Fernando Alvim. The collection emphasizes the African identity over the nationalities of the specific artists. The works of the collection are on display at the Triennial of Luanda as well as international shows such as SD Observatorio, Africa Screams, Beyond Desire, Chéri Samba, Horizons, Voices and Looking Both Ways.

It includes works from the following artists:

 Fanizani Akuda 
 Ghada Amer
 El Anatsui
 Tyrone Appollis
 Miquel Barceló
 Bili Bidjocka
 Tiago Borges
 Willem Boshoff
 Zoulikha Bouabdellah
 Jimoh Buraimoh
 Dj Spooky
 Jean Dubuffet
 Abrie Fourie
 Kendell Geers
 Tapfuma Gutsa
 Romuald Hazoumé
 Alfredo Jaar
 Seidou Keita
 Amal Kenawy
 William Kentridge
 Abdoulaye Konaté
 Goddy Leye
 George Lilanga
 George Ebrin Adingra
 Michèle Magema
 Valente Malangatana
 Joram Mariga
 Santu Mofokeng
 Moké
 Zwelethu Mthethwa
 John Muafangejo
 Henry Munyaradzi
 Ingrid Mwangi
 Chris Ofili
 Olu Oguibe
 Pili Pili
 Tracey Rose
 Ruth Sacks
 Chéri Samba
 Berni Searle
 Yinka Shonibare
 John Takawira
 Pascale Marthine Tayou
 Cyprien Tokoudagba
 Minnette Vári
 Andy Warhol
 Sue Williamson
 Yonamine
 Gavin Young

References

Bibliography 

 Sindika Dokolo, African Collection of contemporary art, 2007.
 Simon Njami, Le saisissement d'être vu, 2007.

See also 

 Contemporary African art
 Luanda
 Sindika Dokolo

Luanda
Non-profit organizations based in Africa
Angolan art
African art museums
Arts organizations based in Africa